The 2004 Copa Sudamericana Finals was a two-legged football match-up to determine the 2004 Copa Sudamericana champion. It was contested by Bolivian club Bolívar and Argentinian club Boca Juniors. Both teams were playing in their first Copa Sudamericana finals. The first leg was played in Estadio Hernando Siles in La Paz on 8 December and the host team Bolívar won 1–0. The second leg was played in La Bombonera in Buenos Aires on 17 December and the host team Boca Juniors won 2–0, thus being crowned the champions.

It was also the first Copa Sudamericana trophy won by Boca Juniors, which as winners, earned the right to play in the 2005 Recopa Sudamericana against the winner of the 2004 Copa Libertadores.

Qualified teams

Road to the final

Match details

First leg

Second Leg

References

2004
s
s
2004–05 in Argentine football
2004
2004